Topisi is a village in Central District of Botswana. The village is located 55 km north of Palapye, along the Palapye–Francistown road, and the population was 1,289 in 2001 census.

References

Populated places in Central District (Botswana)
Villages in Botswana